You Fat Bastards: Live at the Brixton Academy is the only officially released live album by Faith No More. It was recorded by William Shapland on April 28, 1990 in the Brixton Academy, London during the tour supporting their third studio album The Real Thing. It was released on August 20, 1990 internationally and as an audio only version, under the name of Live at the Brixton Academy, in the United Kingdom on February 4, 1991 with two bonus tracks from The Real Thing sessions. The bonus tracks "The Grade" and "The Cowboy Song" were previously released on the "From Out of Nowhere" 12" single but were added to this compilation in order for them to be available on CD. As a result, they do not appear on the vinyl release of Live at Brixton Academy.
The performance of the Black Sabbath song "War Pigs" was later included on the 1994 Black Sabbath tribute compilation Nativity in Black, making it the album's only live track. The reason for including this version, instead of the studio version from The Real Thing album, is unclear.

The video version was later released on a 2-disc DVD set with the video compilation Who Cares a Lot?.

Track lists

4 Live from 5 Fat Bastards
The promotional version contained four tracks from the same recording. Some rare copies of it came with a rubber fish, a reference to the music video for "Epic" which apparently Mike Patton was unaware of.

Personnel
Faith no More
Mike Patton	(credited as Michael Patton) – vocals
Jim Martin	– guitar
Billy Gould	– bass
Roddy Bottum	– keyboards
Mike Bordin	– drums

Production
Matt Wallace	– mixing, producer on "The Grade" and "The Cowboy Song"
Jessica Barford	– producer
John Booth		– director
Will Shapland		– engineer

Certifications

Footnotes

Faith No More video albums
1990 live albums
1990 video albums
Live video albums
London Records video albums
London Records live albums
Slash Records video albums
Slash Records live albums
Reprise Records live albums
Reprise Records video albums
Rhino Records live albums
Rhino Records video albums
Albums recorded at the Brixton Academy
Live alternative metal albums